The Order of the Republic is the  second highest state order after the Order of the State.

The Order is conferred by the President of Turkey, upon the decision of the Council of Ministers, to the prime ministers, ministers and members of foreign missions in recognition of their contributions for bringing the nations closer and enhancing the amicable relations between their respective countries and the Republic of Turkey.

Recipients of the Order of Republic

References

External links

Orders, decorations, and medals of Turkey
Civil awards and decorations of Turkey
Awards established in 1988